The following is a list of major ports in the Philippines organized by water mass.
This list consists primarily of shipping ports, but also includes some that are primarily or significantly devoted to other purposes: cruises, fishing, local delivery, and marinas.

South China Sea 

The South China Sea is west of the Philippines.

Note: In September 2012, Philippine President Benigno Aquino III signed Administrative Order No. 29, mandating that all government agencies use the name "West Philippine Sea" to refer to the parts of the South China Sea within the Philippines' exclusive economic zone, and tasked the National Mapping and Resource Information Authority (NAMRIA) to use the name in official maps.

Philippine Sea 
The Philippine Sea is a marginal sea east and northeast of the Philippines. It is located in the western part of the North Pacific Ocean.

Celebes Sea

Inland Seas

See also
 Philippine Ports Authority
 Philippine Nautical Highway System
 Transportation in the Philippines

References

External links
 Philippine Ports Authority
 Cebu Port Authority
 Subic Bay International Container Terminal

 
Philippines